Nanyue District is one of five districts in Hengyang City, Hunan Province, China; it is also the 2nd smallest district by population (after Wulingyuan District) in Hunan. Nanyue District is a rural district about 45 kilometres away from the city proper of Hengyang, As the location of the Mount Heng, Nanyue is currently one of the main tourist destinations in Hunan or the South China.

Nanyue means the South Great Mountain, the nickname of Mount Heng. The district is named after the Mount Heng, which is one of the Five Great Mountains in China.

Nanyue was formed from parts of Hengshan County in 1984, it was incorporated as a district in the base of the Mount Heng which is one of famous historical and cultural scenic spots in China.

The district is located in the south eastern Hunan and the north of Hengyang. It is surrounded to the north, the east and the south by Hengshan County, to the west by Hengdong County. The district has a subdistrict, a town and a township under its jurisdiction, the government seat is at Zhurong Subdistrict.

History
In December 1951, Mount Heng and its nearby mountainous areas were designated from Hengshan County to Nanyue Special Region newly created. In July 1952, Nanyue Special Region was dissolved and was incorporated into Hengshan County.

In April 1960, the Nanyue Administration was upgraded to a county-level administrative unit. The former Nanyue Commune was divided into the Nanyue Commune and Nanyue Town, which were hosted by the Nanyue Administration. In March 1961, the authority of Nanyue Administration divided the Nanyue Commune into four people's communes of Nanyue, Dianmen, Zhurong and Shigu, the town of Nanyue remained unchanged. In November of the same year, 10 communes of Xinqiao(), Maji, Donghu , Jiangdong, Guantang, Baiguo, Songbai, Wangfeng, Guandi and Tangxing were assigned to the Nanyue Administration mandating.

In June 1963, the Nanyue Administration was reorganized as Nanyue County, which governed 15 communities (towns) of the former Nanyue Administration. In February 1966, Nanyue County was repealed and its administrative divisions were placed in Hengshan County. In May 1984, Nanyue District was established from Nanyue Town, Nanyue Township, 10 villages in the three townships of Donghu, Maji and Wangfeng located in the foothills of Mount Heng in Hengshan County, the district is directly under the jurisdiction of Hengyang.

Geography
Nanyue District stands on the north side of the city proper in Hengyang, it is situated in the hilly and mountainous area of the central Hunan in the northwest of the Xiang River.

Administrative divisions
1 Subdistrict
 Zhurong (

1 town
 Nanyue

1 township
 Shouyue

Population
As of 2017 (year end), the permanent population of the district was 63,800. Of which, the urban population is 44200, the rural population is 19600, and the urbanization rate is 69.28%. The annual birth population is 978, the birth rate is 15.81‰; the death toll is 261, and the death rate is 4.22‰; the natural growth rate of population is 11.59‰.

External links
 Official Website

References

 
County-level divisions of Hunan
Hengyang